Scorpaenopsis vittapinna, the bandfin scorpionfish, is a species of venomous marine ray-finned fish belonging to the family Scorpaenidae, the scorpionfishes. This species is found in the Indo-Pacific from South Africa up to the Red Sea and as far as to French Polynesia, as well as north to Japan and south to Australia.

Size

References

vittapinna
Taxa named by John Ernest Randall
Taxa named by William N. Eschmeyer
Fish described in 2002